The Stoom Stichting Nederland (SSN) is a railway museum in Rotterdam, Netherlands, founded in 1976.

Facilities
The SSN owns a motive power depot which includes a locomotive shed, in which major repairs can be carried out. A turntable, platforms and locomotive facilities also form part of the site. In the museum's engine shed, a large collection of steam locomotives from Germany and the Netherlands may be viewed. Several times a year special train services run throughout the Netherlands and may sometimes be seen in Germany too.

German steam locomotives

Dutch steam locomotives

External links 
 Official website of the SSN
 All data about Dutch museum locomotives

Heritage railways in the Netherlands
Railway museums in the Netherlands